The Last Winter is a 1984 drama film directed by Riki Shelach Nissimoff and produced by Avi Lerner. The film was a joint American-Israeli venture which tells the story of two women seeking leads to their missing husbands after the end of the Yom Kippur War. A relationship builds between them when each identifies her husband in the same blurred image of a foreign newsreel.

Notes

External links
 
 

1984 drama films
1984 films
American drama films
English-language Israeli films
Israeli drama films
TriStar Pictures films
1980s English-language films
1980s American films